Damasco may refer to:

Raynick Damasco, Curacaoan footballer
Damasco, an alternate spelling of Damascus